Dungannon, Ohio may refer to:
 Dungannon, Columbiana County, Ohio
 Dungannon, Noble County, Ohio